Piedone l'africano (internationally released as Flatfoot in Africa, Knock-Out Cop and The K.O. Cop) is a 1978 Italian "poliziottesco"-comedy film directed by Steno and starring Bud Spencer. It is the third and penultimate chapter in the "Flatfoot" film series.
It is preceded by Flatfoot and Flatfoot in Hong Kong  and followed by Flatfoot in Egypt

Plot 
A trail of illicit diamonds takes Flatfoot and his acquaintance, Naples police commissioner Caputo, from Johannesburg to Swakopmund in the hopes of breaking up a South African smuggling ring. They are joined by Bodo, an African child, and confounded in their search by corrupt mining officials and an antagonistic inspector in the South-West African police.

Cast 
 Bud Spencer as Insp. 'Flatfoot' Rizzo 
 Enzo Cannavale as Caputo
 Werner Pochath as Spiros
 Joe Stewardson as Smollet
 Carel Trichardt as captain Muller
 Dagmar Lassander as Margy Connors
 Desmond Thompson as Inspector Desmond
 Baldwin Dakile as Bodo
 Antonio Allocca
 Giovanni Cianfriglia

Trivia 
 During filming in South Africa, there was an incident when Bud Spencer wanted to eat together with black actor Baldwyn Dakile, who played Bodo, in a restaurant in Johannesburg. The boy was denied entry due to apartheid. Spencer then decided not to eat in the restaurant either, but was later informed by the police chief that he would be expelled from the country immediately if this behavior was repeated in the future.

 Bud Spencer was not dubbed in the original version in this film, as in many of his films, but can be heard in his own voice.

 The title song Freedom is interpreted by Guido De Angelis and Maurizio De Angelis under the pseudonym I Charango.

 Since the film was set in South Africa, which was ostracized internationally because of the apartheid prevailing there, the film was not shown in the GDR.

References

External links

1978 films
1970s crime comedy films
Italian crime comedy films
Films directed by Stefano Vanzina
Films scored by Guido & Maurizio De Angelis
1970s police comedy films
Poliziotteschi films
Films set in South Africa
Films shot in South Africa
Films set in Namibia
Films shot in Namibia
Films set in Naples
Films shot in Naples
1978 comedy films
1970s Italian films